The Communications Regulatory Agency of Bosnia and Herzegovina (CRA) (Bosnian, Croatian, Serbian: Regulatorna agencija za komunikacije Cyrillic script: Регулаторна агенције за комуникације) is the regulatory agency for electronic communications in Bosnia and Herzegovina.

The Agency's mission is to regulate the electronic communications and audiovisual sector in Bosnia and Herzegovina and the management and supervision of the frequency spectrum. With the aim of creating the conditions for the application of new technologies, the Agency encourages the development of a competitive electronic communications sector and offer high-quality services in the best interests of the end-user, and the development of media freedom for the benefit of citizens and society as a whole.

The director of the agency is, since 14 July 2020, Draško Milinović. Milinović started as a member of cabinet of Željka Cvijanović and chief of cabinet of Milorad Dodik, and was appointed in 2014 as head of Radio Televizija Republike Srpske (RTRS). During Milinović's mandate, RTRS has been sanctioned multiple times by the CRA for non-respect of editorial standards, including for historical revisionist statements as regards the 25 May 1995 Tuzla massacre.

Because they recognized the importance of the agency, many ambassadors and representatives from international organizations visited CRA. Some Embassies even donated equipment and other material and technical support. CRA cooperates, on regular basis, with similar european partners. In accordance with international standards and also the staff trained at some of the most renowned media institutions throughout the world. 
Communications Regulatory Agency of Bosnia and Herzegovina is member of the Central and Eastern European Working Group.

References

External links
 Official CRA website

2001 establishments in Bosnia and Herzegovina
Organizations established in 2001
Government of Bosnia and Herzegovina
Organizations based in Sarajevo